The 1911 Coronation Honours were awarded in honour of the coronation of George V.

Most Honourable Order of the Bath

Companion of the Order of the Bath (CB)
 Colonel (temporary Major-General) George Macaulay Kirkpatrick, Inspector-General, Military Forces, Commonwealth of Australia.

Most Distinguished Order of St Michael and St George

Knight Grand Cross of the Order of St Michael and St George (GCMG)
The Right Honourable The Lord Denman, Governor-General and Commander-in-Chief designate of the Commonwealth of Australia
Sir George Houston Reid, High Commissioner in London for the Commonwealth of Australia

Knight Commander of the Order of St Michael and St George (KCMG)
Rear-Admiral William Rooke Creswell, Director of Naval Forces of the Commonwealth of Australia
Sir John Fuller, 1st Baronet, Governor of the State of Victoria
Major-General John Charles Hoad, Chief of the General Staff of the Military Forces of the Commonwealth of Australia

Companion of the Order of St Michael and St George (CMG)
Robert Archibald Ranking, Esq., First Police Magistrate of the State of Queensland.
Lionel Henry Sholl, Esq., Under Secretary and Government Statist of the State of South Australia.
The Honourable Frank Wilson, Premier and Colonial Treasurer of the State of Western Australia.

Imperial Service Order

Companion of the Imperial Service Order (ISO)
 William Davidson, Esq., Inspector General of Public Works of the State of Victoria. 
 James William Jones, Esq., Secretary, Office of the Commissioner of Public Works, and chairman, Supply and Tender Board, State of South Australia.
 John Mackay, Esq., Portmaster, Harbour Master and Chairman of the Marine Board, State of Queensland.
 Clayton Turner Mason, Esq., late Collector of Customs (Western Australia), Department of Trade and Customs, Commonwealth of Australia.

References

1911 awards
Orders, decorations, and medals of Australia